The Segner wheel or Segner turbine is a type of water turbine invented by Johann Andreas Segner in the 18th century.  It uses the same principle as Hero's aeolipile.

The device is placed in a suitable hole in the ground (or at the slope of a hill). The water is delivered to the top of a vertical cylinder, at the bottom of which is a rotor with specially bent pipes with nozzles (see image). Due to the hydrostatic pressure, the water is ejected from the nozzles, causing the rotor to rotate. The useful torque is transferred to a powered device through a belt and pulley system.

Segner turbines, also called reaction or Scotch turbines, were built in the mid-1850s to power the inclined plane lifts along the Morris Canal in New Jersey. Today, the Segner wheel principle is used in irrigation sprinklers.

Alexander Bogdanov cited this an example of an important innovation which paved the way for the development of steam engines.

The turbine at Museo Hacienda Buena Vista is "the only pre-Scotch (sic) type known to exist and is the sole extant example of a pioneer and historically important machine that was invented at the close of the 17th century by Dr. Baker.... The Buena Vista turbine is, in effect, a missing link in the evolution of mechanical artifacts better known to the historians of technology.'' (The Journal of the Society for Industrial Archaeology, Vol. 4, No. 1 [1978],  pp.55–58)."

Gallery

References

External links

 Barker's Mill at physics.kenyon.edu

Water turbines
Hungarian inventions